Bhojpur District is one of 14 districts of Koshi Province of eastern Nepal. The district's area is 1,507 km2 with a population of 182,459 (2011). The administrative center is Bhojpur. It is surrounded by Dhankuta and Sankhuwasabha in the east, Khotang in the west, again Sankhuwasabha in north-east and Solukhumbu in the north-west and Udayapur in the South.

Etymology
According to the District Coordination Committee Bhojpur, this place was named after Betula utilis - the Himalayan birch, which was found here in large quantities. The Nepali name for Betula utilis is "Bhojpatra" (भोजपत्र).

"Bhojpur" is a combination of two words "Bhoj" and "Pur", Bhoj refers to Bhojpatra (Betula utilis) and Pur refers to a place or city.

According to history, Prithvi Narayan Shah gave a big party after winning a battle in this place. The Meaning of "Bhojpur" means party and "Pur" meaning "buried". After the party the food was more than enough for them and they were unable to eat it all. After that the Nepali armies buried all their wasted food here. So the name became Bhojpur.

Geography and climate 
Classified as a Hill District, Bhojpur actually spans five of Nepal's eight climate zones. 3% of the district's area is below 300 meters elevation in the Lower Tropical zone and 31% is Upper Tropical from 300 to 1,000 meters.  50% of the land area belongs to the Subtropical Zone between 1,000 and 2,000 meters and 15% is Temperate (2,000 to 3,000 meters).  2% rises higher into the Subalpine Zone.

Divisions
Bhojpur is divided into two urban and seven rural municipalities:

Towns and villages (former VDC) 

 Aangtep
 Annapurna
 Baikunthe
 Balankha
 Basikhora
 Basingtharpu
 Bastim
 Bhaisipankha
 Bhubal
 Bhulke
 Bokhim
 Bhojpur
 Boya
 Champe
 Changre
 Charambi
 Chaukidanda
 Chhinamakhu
 Dalgaun
 Deurali
 Dewantar
 Dhodalekhani
 Dobhane
 Dummana
 Gogane
 Gupteshwar
 Hasanpur
 Helauchha
 Homtang
 Jarayotar
 Kimalung
 Keurepani
 Khairang
 Khartimchha
 Khatamma
 Khawa
 Kot
 Kudak Kaule
 Kulunga
 Lekharka
 Mane Bhanjyang
 Mulpani
 Nagi
 Nepaledada
 Okhre
 Pangcha
 Patle Pani
 Pawala
 Pyauli
 Ranibas
 Sangpang
 Sano Dumba
 Shadanand Municipality
 Shyamsila
 Siddheshwar
 Sindrang
 Syamsila
 Taksar
 Thidingkha
 Thulo Dumba
 Timma
 Tiwari Bhanjyang
 Tunggochha
 Yaku
 Yangpang

Demographics
At the time of the 2011 Nepal census, Bhojpur District had a population of 182,459. Of these, 49.0% spoke Nepali, 19.7% Bantawa, 7.5% Tamang, 4.5% Newar, 3.4% Magar, 3.0% Dungmali, 2.4% Kulung, 2.0% Sampang, 1.5% Sherpa, 1.4% Rai, 1.2% Chamling, 0.7% Nachhiring, 0.3% Bhujel, 0.3% Gurung, 0.3% Mewahang, 0.3% Thulung, 0.2% Koi, 0.2% Maithili, 0.1% Bhojpuri, 0.1% Ghale, 0.1% Khaling, 0.1% Limbu, 0.1% Sanskrit, 0.1% Thangmi, 0.1% Yakkha and 0.9% other languages as their first language.

In terms of ethnicity/caste, 32.1% were Rai, 19.7% Chhetri, 9.5% Tamang, 8.0% Newar, 6.2% Hill Brahmin, 4.9% Kami, 4.7% Magar, 2.6% Damai/Dholi, 2.3% Sarki, 2.2% Kulung, 1.7% Gharti/Bhujel, 1.7% Sherpa, 0.9% Sanyasi/Dasnami, 0.6% Nachhiring, 0.4% Gurung, 0.3% Ghale, 0.2% Majhi, 0.2% Mewahang Bala, 0.1% Bantawa, 0.1% Kumal, 0.1% Limbu, 0.1% Samgpang, 0.1% Sunuwar, 0.1% Thakuri, 0.1% Thami, 0.1% Thulung, 0.1% Yakkha, 0.1% Yamphu and 0.3% others.

In terms of religion, 53.3% were Hindu, 31.5% Kirati, 14.2% Buddhist, 0.5% Christian, 0.2% Prakriti and 0.2% others.

In terms of literacy, 69.1% could read and write, 2.5% could only read and 28.3% could neither read nor write.

2015 Nepal earthquake 
The district was affected by an earthquake on 25 April 2015.

See also 
Zones of Nepal

References

Further reading

External links 

 
Districts of Koshi Province
Districts of Nepal established during Rana regime or before